Orser is a surname. Notable people with the surname include:

 Barbara Jayne Orser (born 1957), Canadian academic 
 Brian Orser (born 1961), Canadian figure skater
 Earl Orser (1928–2004), Canadian businessman
 Leland Orser (born 1960/61), American actor

See also
 Corser